Lucius Roscius Otho was Roman tribune during the year 67 BC. He is most famous for the Roscian law. He was an intimate friend of Cicero who defended his law against the public upset

Roscian law 
The Roscian law restored for members of the Equestrian order the right to the first 14 rows in Roman theatres, behind the 4 rows reserved for members of the Roman Senate. The Equestrian order is the second rank of the Roman Aristocracy, ranking below the patricians.

References

Year of birth missing
Year of death missing
Tribunes of the plebs
1st-century BC Romans